Caazapá is a department in Paraguay. The capital is the city of Caazapá. Among Paraguayans, the department is well known for its orange and mandarin trees, and for its forest hills. The eastern part of Caazapá is relatively undeveloped and consists of rolling hills and large swaths of Brazilian Atlantic interior rainforest between the San Rafael mountains to the south and the Ybytyruzú mountains to the north. The western part is an area of low-lying marshes and swampland area, and consists of wetlands and tributaries to eastern Paraguay's largest river, the Tebicuary. Many indigenous groups make their home in what remains of the rainforest, especially south of the unpaved highway between San Juan Nepomuceno and Tavaí. Mby'a and Guayaki people, who practice farming corn, cassava and yerba mate under the canopy of the forest live in small bands and travel mainly by foot. They are technically protected and their land is a national reserve, but illegal loggers, ranchers, and more recently, Brazilian soybean growers have encroached upon their territory. With Paraguay's weak legal infrastructure, little can be done by way of enforcement or sanctions.

Districts

The department is divided in 11 districts:

History

Its history is linked to the first franciscan religious missionaries in Paraguay, who founded several mission-towns (reducciones), where they accomplished to exempt the natives of 10 years of patronage. It is one of the first missions established in Río de la Plata.

The central region of the country, such as Caazapá is the region that helped the most to consolidate and form the history of Paraguay. The presence of the Franciscans in the Missions Yuty and Caazapá is a process that started in 1607 and continued through the 17th and 18th centuries. In 1786, the Mission San Juan Nepomuceno was founded, which helped, along with other localities, to work and exploit the land.

In 1906, by law, Caazapá was constituted as the department No. 6 of Paraguay, being the city of the same name, its capital. Since 1973 the limits haven't been modified and stay the same nowadays.

In late 19th century, Australian colonists settled in this department to found a socialist colony. Until now, descendants of those colonists live in the town. One of the most notorious personalities that are descendant of these colonists is the comic book writer Robin Wood. Other famous people from Caazapá are:

 M. D. Pedro N. Ciancio, the first pediatrician of Paraguay, and who brought to the country the first grains of soy.
 M. D. Pedro Duarte Ortellado, creator of the Ministry of Health and its first minister.
 Félix Paiva, lawyer and President of the Republic between 1937 and 1939.
 Maria Concepción Leyes de Chávez, writer.
 Miguel Ángel Pangrazio, lawyer and writer.
 Ana Iris Chávez de Ferreiro, poet and writer.
 Felipe Sosa, guitar player.
 Father José de Jesús Aguirre, writer and psychologist.
 Monsignor Saro Vera, writer.

Limits

Located south-east in the Oriental Región of Paraguay, between parallels 25° 30' and 26° 45' of latitude South, and between the meridians 55° 15' and 56° 45' of longitude West.

To the North, it limits with the Guairá and Caaguazú departments

To the South with Itapúa,

To the East with Alto Paraná and

To the West with Misiones and Paraguarí.

Climate

The highest temperatures reach 37 °C and the lowest drop to 1 °C, the average is 21 °C. It is one of the departments with more quantity of precipitation.

Orography and soil

The soil is composed by sandstone from the Carboniferous period, of fluvial and glacial origin. The land form low hills with no more than 200 meters in height and rise towards the Ybyturuzú Cordillera.

The Caazapá Cordillera, Monte Rosario and San Rafael chain of mountains cross throughout the department from East to West, with some hills of medium high such as Mbatovi, Ñú Cañy, Pacurí and Morotí. This cordillera separates the land in two different regions, to the north-east, there are meadows, lagoons, swamps and fields for agriculture; to the south-east there are hills and forests.

Hydrography

The Tebicuary River crosses the department from East to West, also the South of the department and serves as limit with Itapúa department. The Tebicuary-mi River serves as limit with Paraguarí.

The Pirapó River flows into the Tebiacuary River, in the center area of the department. In Caazapá are the sources of two streams, Capiíbary and Ypety.

The streams Iñaro, Guazú and Charará are located in the territory of Caazapá as well.

Natural environment and vegetation

The natural environment of the region and all along the Caaguazú Cordillera is great example of the vast vegetation in the country.

The whole department is in the Central Forest Region. The wooded landscape has suffered the consequences of being used for breeding cattle and the abused of technology that affects the soil, being both situations a problem for the natural environment in this area.

There are some vegetable species that are in danger, such as yvyra paje, yvyra asy and nandyta. Among the animal species in danger are the tiririca, margay, lobopé and aira’y.

The protected areas are:

– Caaguazú National Park, with 16,000 hectares.
– Golondrina Private Reserve, with 24,077 hectares.

Tourism

The Franciscan Museum is a much visited place by the tourists. Also, the Ykua Bolaños, which is a spring with a particular legend. The legend tells that a Priest, Luis de Bolaños, wanting to convince the natives of the existence of God, hit the rock and the water surged; creating a miracle that would convince them.

In the city Maciel, there is an old train station.

The hills Mbatovi, Ñu Cañy, Pacuri and the Serranía del Rosario, are also very attractive for the tourists.

The rivers Tebicuary, Tebicuary-mi, Pirapó and Capiibary are interesting recreational places to go swimming.

Economy

Caazapá produces cotton, soy, sweet, cane, corn and manioc. The production of soy grains is so abundant that this department is called “The Farm of the Oriental Region”.

The forestall exploit was a great part of the department's economic activity 30 years ago, but has diminished in the later years.

There are not much industries in the region, but the ones that are, dedicate to processing of food, honey, sweet cane and starch.

Communication and services

The most important way of access to the department is Route No. 8 “Dr. Blas Garay”, which joins the routes No 2 and 7 in Coronel Oviedo. It communicates Caazapá with the rest of the country.

The railway Carlos Antonio López used to cross the department from North to South, 96 kilometers of extension, and included the road San Salvador – Abaí.

The rivers that bathe Caazapá are navigable for small ships. The department also has airstrips for small and medium planes.

Caazapá also has several television and radio stations, such as Hechizo SRL, in AM and Yeruti Comunicaciones, Itacurú SRL, La Voz de Bolaños, Caazapá Poty, Tupa Renda, La Victoria SA, Aguaí Poty and 94.3 in FM.

There are 28.276 housings in the department, 5.765 in the urban area and 22.511 in the rural area. The percentage of which count with basic facilities are the following:

Electrical power: 16,1%
Running water: 5,8%
Trash recollection: 0,3%

Education

Caazapá has 205 educational institutions, 402 elemental schools and 51 high schools.

The education in the department includes education about the natives of the country.

Health

There are 48 health institutions in Caazapá, including hospitals and health care facilities. In this, are not included the private institutions.

References 

 Illustrated Geography of Paraguay, SRL Distributed Arami, 2007. 
 Geography of Paraguay, First Edition 1999, Publisher Hispanic Paraguay SRL

External links

 Radio Caazapa Poty 98.1 FM
  SENATUR
  ABC Color